The Minister of Cooperative Governance and Traditional Affairs is a Minister in the Cabinet of South Africa who is responsible for the Department of Cooperative Governance and the Department of Traditional Affairs.

List of ministers

References

External links
Department of Cooperative Governance and Traditional Affairs

Lists of political office-holders in South Africa